For the city in Sonora, Mexico, see: Cumpas

Cumpas Ltd. is a registered charity which promotes Cornish music and dance. It was founded in 1996 by Hilary Coleman and Frances Bennett. Its original name was Cornish Music Projects. Cumpas is a Cornish word meaning shipshape or proper job.

It promotes regular music events at Nancledra, Truro, Tywardreath and St Day. It supports music in education workshops and publishes teaching resources.

References

External links

About Hilary Coleman; Shout Kernow

Cornish music
Organisations based in Cornwall